The 2011 Eastern Kentucky Colonels football team represented Eastern Kentucky University in the 2011 NCAA Division I FCS football season. The Colonels were led by fourth-year head coach Dean Hood and played their home games at Roy Kidd Stadium. They were a member of the Ohio Valley Conference (OVC). Eastern Kentucky  has an  overall record 7–5 with a 6–2 mark in OVC play share the conference title with Jacksonville State and Tennessee Tech. They received an at–large bid in the FCS playoffs, where they lost in the first round to James Madison.

Schedule

References

Eastern Kentucky
Eastern Kentucky Colonels football seasons
Ohio Valley Conference football champion seasons
Eastern Kentucky
Eastern Kentucky Colonels football